From January 28 to February 4, 2023, a Chinese-operated high-altitude balloon was spotted in North American airspace, including Alaska, western Canada, and the contiguous United States. On February 4, the U.S. Air Force shot down the balloon over U.S. territorial waters off the coast of South Carolina, on the order of U.S. President Joe Biden. Debris from the wreckage was recovered and sent to the FBI Laboratory in Quantico, Virginia, for analysis.

The American and Canadian militaries announced that the balloon was for surveillance, while the Chinese government maintained it was a civilian (mainly meteorological) airship that had been blown off course. The U.S. said that the balloon was capable of geolocating electronic communications and carried intelligence surveillance equipment inconsistent with that of a weather balloon. It added that similar Chinese spy balloons have flown over more than 40 nations. Analysts said that its flight path and structural characteristics were dissimilar from those of a typical weather balloon. American officials later disclosed that they had been tracking the Chinese balloon since it was launched from Hainan. Its original destinations were likely Guam and Hawaii, but prevailing winds blew it off course and across North America.

The incident increased U.S.–China tensions. The United States has called the balloon's presence a violation of its sovereignty, and its Secretary of State Antony Blinken postponed a long-awaited diplomatic visit to Beijing. Canada summoned the Chinese ambassador in response to the incident.

On February 2, a similar Chinese balloon was observed flying over Latin America. In the United States, three other high-altitude objects, over Northern Alaska (February 10), Yukon (February 11), and Lake Huron (February 11–12) respectively, were detected and subsequently shot down; later assessment said they had no relations to China.

Background

Spy balloon history and technology

The earliest record of military ballooning shows sky lanterns being used for signaling in 3rd century China. In the west, balloons became valued for their role in observing the battlefield and directing artillery. Their usage peaked during World War I, after which they were increasingly replaced with airplanes. During the Cold War, the United States sent hundreds of reconnaissance balloons, ostensibly for "meteorological survey" under Project Genetrix, over China and other Eastern Bloc countries to gain intelligence on their nuclear capabilities, despite their protests.

Although mostly supplanted by surveillance satellites and unmanned aerial vehicles, balloons have retained some advantages, such as a lower cost of production and deployment. By 2019, the Pentagon had invested millions in COLD STAR (Covert Long Dwell Stratospheric Architecture), a project for stealthy balloons that are now being transitioned from narcotics surveillance to military service. China recognizes the importance of catching up to foreign countries in this domain. Its military publications have highlighted the use of balloons to reconnoiter enemy air defense and enhance China's own defense capabilities. It has also flown high-altitude balloons to drop-test different hypersonic missile designs.

Past Chinese balloons and unidentified objects 
Suspected Chinese surveillance balloons had been detected in U.S. airspace in the past, namely over Guam, Hawaii, and Florida. One occurred earlier during Joe Biden's presidency (2021–present) and three occurred during Donald Trump's presidency (2017–2021). They did not persist as long as the 2023 incident, and China was able to recover those balloons. Other pre-2023 incursions have remained unexplained, classified by U.S. authorities as unidentified aerial phenomena. The commander of United States Northern Command (USNORTHCOM), General Glen VanHerck, said that the U.S. failure to detect and identify all such incursions was "a domain awareness gap that we have to figure out".

The U.S. Department of State said that a fleet of Chinese balloons have flown over more than forty countries and linked the surveillance activity to the Chinese military. In 2020 and 2021, similar balloons were sighted in Sendai and Hachinohe, Japan respectively, but they were not identified as of Chinese origin at the time. A similar aircraft was sighted in January 2022 over India's strategically important Andaman and Nicobar islands. In February 2022, several balloons were detected off the coast of Taiwan, which their Ministry of National Defense said were likely for meteorological observations for the PLA's Eastern Theater Command. Another crashed near Taiwan in February 2023, carrying an antenna, a transmitter, temperature and humidity sensors, and was likely from China as well.

U.S.–China tensions

The 2023 balloon incident occurred while U.S.–China relations were at their worst in decades, following suspected incidents of Chinese espionage and amid increasing strategic competition in military and economic sectors. In 2022, the United States, along with some of its allies, imposed stringent export controls on "foundational technologies", such as semiconductor microprocessors, to China in order to hamper latter's development of advanced technology and military tools. It has also sought to maintain critical supply chains independent from China.

Incident

Balloon

Size, propulsion, and payload
The balloon carried an underslung payload described as a "technology bay" estimated to be the size of "two or three school buses" and was powered by sixteen solar arrays mounted on the payload.

National Security Council spokesman Admiral John Kirby said the craft had a propeller and could be maneuvered. U.S. officials told foreign diplomats in Beijing that the craft had rudders and propellers. A Chinese Foreign Ministry spokesperson said it had "limited self-steering capability".

The U.S. Department of Defense said the balloon did not present a military or physical threat to people on the ground while it remained in the air, and that shooting it down over water would be safer and increased the opportunity to study the wreckage for intelligence purposes.

Citing a PLA procurement portal, a U.S. official said that the balloon was manufactured by a civilian Chinese defense contractor.

Signals intelligence capabilities

Those interviewed by BBC News said it was unusual for weather balloons to last as long as the one involved in the incident and that the balloon "might have been more sophisticated than China claims".

Images from U-2 flybys and forensic analysis of the payload showed antennas that likely were used for collecting and transmitting signals intelligence. A publicly released U.S. State Department document, after the balloon was downed and debris collected, said that the balloon's solar arrays produced sufficient power to operate "multiple active intelligence collection sensors" and that the antennas on the balloon could collect and geolocate communications, including radio and mobile phone signals, but it was unknown if any specific devices were targets. Former U.S. Air Force Lt. General Charles "Tuna" Moore said that the surveillance technology aboard was inconsistent with meteorological missions and hypothesized that the Chinese would be interested in finding vulnerabilities and "building a picture of our radar, weapon system and communication capabilities".

U.S. authorities did not name the manufacturer of the balloon but said with high confidence that the entity has "direct commercial ties" to the People's Liberation Army. They cited this as an example of military-civil fusion, where China encourages competition from and technology exchange with its private sector in an attempt to overcome the inefficiencies and corruption of its state-owned defense corporations.

Detection 

High-altitude balloons are extremely difficult to detect. A 2005 study by the U.S. Air Force's Air University states surveillance balloons often present very small radar cross-sections, "on the order of hundredths of a square meter, about the same as a small bird", and essentially no infrared signature, which complicates the use of anti-aircraft weapons. A 2009 research paper by a USAF officer stated that balloons "are inherently stealthy" due to a tiny infrared signature at high altitude (as the balloon possesses no engines) and because of the difficulty of radar detection (as the balloons lack sharp edges and metal structures).

The balloon's first reported sighting was on February 1, 2023, when civilians on a commercial airliner spotted it. On the same day, former Billings Gazette editor Chase Doak spotted the object above Billings, Montana, after seeing reports that the airspace around Billings was closed. He had initially assumed it was a star or a UFO. Doak contacted his friend and Billings Gazette photographer Larry Mayer, and the two photographed the balloon using telephoto lenses. Mayer also sent the images to various government agencies. After the photographs were published in the Billings Gazette and received widespread media coverage, the U.S. Department of Defense and the Canadian Department of National Defence announced on February 2 that NORAD was aware of a high-altitude surveillance balloon believed to belong to China and had been tracking it for "several" days.

American defense officials considered shooting the balloon down but initially decided not to due to the risk of debris injuring civilians on the ground. A meeting was convened between Secretary of Defense Austin, Chairman of the Joint Chiefs of Staff General Mark Milley, NORTHCOM/NORAD Commander General VanHerck, and other military commanders. Biden was advised by officials not to shoot it down because debris could threaten civilians or cause property damage.

Flight path 

The balloon entered U.S. airspace above the Aleutian Islands on January 28, 2023, then moved across Alaska, and entered Canadian airspace over the Yukon and Northwest Territories on January 30, 2023. After flying southeast over British Columbia, the balloon then crossed into the U.S. in northern Idaho on January 31, and Montana on February 1, where it was spotted over Billings. Montana is the location of multiple nuclear missile installations, including Malmstrom Air Force Base, one of three U.S. Air Force bases from which intercontinental ballistic missiles are operated, causing suspicion that the balloon had been launched to surveil said nuclear installations. A meteorological researcher calculated a possible trajectory along this path using the HYSPLIT atmospheric model, consistent with data on prevailing westerlies from China to Montana. The balloon was spotted above northwest Missouri, near Kansas City, on February 3.

An unnamed U.S. defense official told The Washington Post that the balloon was not a derelict object as it generally followed jet stream patterns but loitered when it was near sensitive sites, such as the Malmstrom AFB. The Post said that that observation undermined Chinese assertions that the balloon was a wayward device. The U.S. ground-based intercontinental nuclear arsenal is composed of about 400 LGM-30 Minuteman III missiles deployed in missile silos around Malmstrom AFB, Montana; Minot AFB, North Dakota; and Francis E. Warren AFB, Wyoming. Experts interviewed by Time said that the balloon traveled for a much longer distance than what would be expected of a standard weather balloon and that Chinese officials should not have been surprised that the balloon would have eventually either crossed the U.S. or been detected.

Business jets can reach , current commercial airliners can reach , and the SR-71 had reached .

U.S. monitoring and counterintelligence 

During the incident, a U.S. defense official stated that the balloon had "limited additive value from an intelligence collection perspective". Nonetheless, the Pentagon took steps to protect its assets from leaking sensitive information to the balloon. U.S. Secretary of Defense Lloyd Austin said the U.S. military was able to collect valuable intelligence on the balloon while it was transiting North America. VanHerck said that the U.S. Department of Defense obtained special authorization to collect intelligence against the balloon within the U.S.

Two F-22 Raptors were scrambled from Nellis Air Force Base after the balloon was spotted on February 1. It was also monitored by crewed aircraft deployed by NORAD, including a Boeing E-3 Sentry Airborne Early Warning and Control System (AWACS), a Boeing RC-135 reconnaissance aircraft, a U-2S Dragon Lady, and another F-22 Raptor from Langley Air Force Base. The U.S. Department of Defense said that, during the balloon's overflight of the United States, it had blocked the balloon from gathering intelligence and was able to study the balloon and its equipment. Additionally, CNN reported that the US was able to track and monitor the balloon by its signals. However, the balloon seemed to stop transmitting once the US learned about it.

A U.S. government official said that at least two U-2S reconnaissance aircraft were used to gather data about the balloon while it was over the Midwest, though it was not clear at which points in the balloon's flight it was tracked by U-2S aircraft. The War Zone commented that the U-2S's high flight ceiling, exceeding , allowed it to observe the balloon from within relatively close proximity (including from above), and its electronic warfare suite allowed the aircraft to potentially jam or monitor any radio emissions from the balloon, such as data transmissions directed upwards towards Chinese communications satellites.

Downing 

On February 4, the balloon had drifted over the Carolinas. The Federal Aviation Administration closed airspace over the area in one of the largest temporary flight restrictions in U.S. history, "more than five times the restricted airspace surrounding Washington, D.C., and nearly double the area of the state of Massachusetts". A ground stop was ordered on the coast at Myrtle Beach International Airport and Charleston International Airport in South Carolina, and Wilmington International Airport in North Carolina. Military aircraft were reported to be over the Carolinas. U.S. officials later stated that this was in preparation for the eventual downing of the balloon within American territorial waters over the Atlantic Ocean.

The balloon was shot down over U.S. territorial waters off the coast of Surfside Beach, South Carolina, by an AIM-9X Sidewinder missile fired from a U.S. Air Force F-22 Raptor that had departed from Langley Air Force Base; the downing occurred at 2:39 p.m. eastern time. The downing was the first recorded by a F-22 aircraft, the first of an aircraft over U.S. territory since World War II, and is speculated to be the highest altitude air-to-air kill in recorded history.

Debris recovery 

VanHerck said the United States Navy was conducting recovery operations while the U.S. Coast Guard was securing the region where the debris fell. Guided-missile destroyer , guided-missile cruiser , and dock landing ship  were tasked with retrieving the balloon wreckage, alongside Coast Guard cutters and helicopters, U.S. Navy divers, and FBI counterintelligence agents. General VanHerck stated that unmanned underwater vehicles controlled from rigid inflatable boats used side-scan sonar to locate the sunken debris. The unmanned submersibles analyzed the wreckage to identify potential threats to recovery divers, such as explosives or batteries with hazardous materials.

On February 6, some of the downed payload was sent to the FBI Laboratory in Quantico, Virginia, for forensic analysis by the Bureau's Operational Technology Division. Possible balloon debris was spotted later on the South Carolina coast, where police were asking residents to report other sightings. China said it wanted the wreckage returned, but the U.S. said it had no plans to do so.

By February 13, the U.S. had recovered a significant portion of the balloon's payload off the South Carolina coast. The payload measured  and had all of the craft's equipment and antennas. NORTHCOM said: "Recovery operations near South Carolina continue. Crews have been able to recover significant debris from the site, including all of the priority sensor and electronics pieces identified as well as large sections of the structure. Weather permitted crane operations at the site late last week. Due to weather today [February 14], underwater recovery activities are limited but will resume as conditions permit."

On February 17, the U.S. military said that recovery operations have concluded for the balloon after the final debris was located and retrieved.

Legality of airspace and downing 
The United States asserts sovereignty of the airspace above its territories. Like that of other countries, this right, up to the ill-defined boundary of space, is recognized by the Chicago Convention on International Civil Aviation. Foreign aircraft are generally permitted to transit through U.S. airspace but must follow specific procedures and regulations. Article 8 of the convention states that aircraft flown without pilots must obtain permission from the country below and must be controlled to reduce danger.

Before the revelation by the United States that the balloon was likely blown off course, analysts concluded that shooting it down was legal under U.S. domestic law. Its destruction under international law is murkier due to potential intervening factors such as force majeure, but characterizing it as an act of reprisal would help firm up that position. Although China protested the shootdown, Julian Ku, professor of law at Hofstra University, said that the wording of China's statement reflects that its Ministry of Foreign Affairs "does not believe downing the balloon is a clear legal violation."

Response and reactions

United States 
Secretary of State Blinken postponed a scheduled diplomatic trip to China in response, which would have been the first such visit since 2018. The White House did not want to announce the balloon's incursion to protect Blinken's visit, but press and social media interest made Pentagon officials comment.

In response to questions regarding the situation, on February 4, Biden said, "We're going to take care of it". Later that day, U.S. officials disclosed that three days earlier he had granted permission to down the balloon.

Pentagon officials stated that there was no earlier opportunity to shoot down over water, rebutting Trump and other Republicans who criticized the Biden administration for not shooting down the balloon earlier. Senate Democratic Leader Chuck Schumer added: "The bottom line here is that shooting down the balloon over water wasn't just the safest option, but it was the one that maximized our intel gain."

On February 6, U.S. Deputy Secretary of State Wendy Sherman briefed 150 diplomats from about 40 embassies on China's balloon surveillance program, said by U.S. officials to have been operated for several years by the People's Liberation Army from Hainan on China's south coast, as part of an effort to "name and shame" Chinese espionage by publicizing it. Officials are communicating separately with countries where they say there have been at least two dozen such overflights since 2018, including Japan, India, Vietnam, Taiwan and the Philippines in addition to North and South America.

The U.S. House Armed Services Committee held a February 7 hearing on wide-ranging Chinese military and intelligence threats including the balloon incursions. Committee chair Republican Mike Rogers characterized the balloon as an intentionally calculated show of force. A U.S. official told The Washington Post there was no sense that the balloon was a deliberate provocation, as it was part of an ongoing global surveillance program. The U.S. House of Representatives voted 419–0 to adopt a resolution condemning China for the incident.

Trump called reports of intrusions during his administration "fake disinformation"; and his ex-top national security officials said they were unaware of any balloon incursions during their tenure. Biden administration National Security Advisor Jake Sullivan said that improved airspace surveillance ordered by Biden after he took office had detected the previous incursions and "enhanced our capacity to be able to detect things that the Trump administration was unable to detect".

On February 10, the U.S. accused six Chinese companies of supporting the country's military and balloon surveillance program and added them to the U.S. Commerce Department Bureau of Industry and Security's Entity List, which places certain restrictions on exports: Beijing Nanjiang Aerospace Technology Co., Ltd.; China Electronics Technology Group Corporation 48th Research Institute; Dongguan Lingkong Remote Sensing Technology Co., Ltd.; Eagles Men Aviation Science and Technology Group Co., Ltd. (EMAST); Guangzhou Tian-Hai-Xiang Aviation Technology Co., Ltd.; and Shanxi Eagles Men Aviation Science and Technology Group Co., Ltd. Washington did not specifically link any of them to the balloon that it had shot down.

On February 14, intelligence officials began to explore the possibility that the balloon had not been intended to penetrate U.S. airspace and transit the continental United States but that Chinese authorities had instead sought to engage in more typical surveillance activities near Guam before the balloon potentially became blown off course. These discussions suggested that the international incident caused by the balloon's cross-continental transit may have been partly the result of an accident.

On February 16, President Biden gave his first formal remarks on the incident saying, "We're not looking for a new Cold War, but I make no apologies, we will compete and we will responsibly manage that competition so that it doesn't veer into conflict." He further directed his team to develop "sharper rules on how to address these unidentified objects in the future so that the government can distinguish between those that are likely to pose safety and security risks that necessitate action and those that do not."

In March, senators Mark Kelly and Ted Budd introduced legislation to mandate tracking of high-altitude balloons.

Canada 
Canadian officials and Global Affairs Canada summoned the Chinese Ambassador to Canada, Cong Peiwu, to Ottawa while the Department of National Defence announced it was monitoring the situation alongside the United States through NORAD. A statement from the Canadian Armed Forces said there was no threat to Canadians, and Minister of Foreign Affairs Mélanie Joly would remain in contact with Blinken.

China 
On February 3, spokesperson of the Chinese Ministry of Foreign Affairs Mao Ning said: "It is a civilian airship used for research, mainly meteorological, purposes. Affected by the Westerlies and with limited self-steering capability, the airship deviated far from its planned course." She said China regretted the unintentional incident, citing force majeure. On February 6, Mao said that the U.S. "hyped up the incident on purpose and even used force to attack", and called the shoot down "an unacceptable and irresponsible action".

According to the BBC, Chinese state media initially ignored the incident but became more defensive after the "near-apologetic tone" of its Ministry of Foreign Affairs. On February 3, China Daily called the spying claims a lie, saying: "To spy on the U.S. with a balloon, one must both fall far behind to use a 1940s technology and be advanced enough to control its flight across the ocean." Chinese netizens speculated about the maker of the balloon and unconfirmed reports of an unidentified object off the coast of Shandong. The incident coincided with the release of science fiction movie The Wandering Earth 2 in mainland China, causing some internet users and media to coin the name "The Wandering Balloon".

After the downing on February 5, Vice Foreign Minister Xie Feng said he had filed a formal complaint with the U.S. Embassy in response to the incident. Xie accused the United States of indiscriminately using force against the civilian airship that was about to leave U.S. airspace in violation of "the spirit of international law and international practice" and said that the Chinese government reserved the right to "take further necessary responses". On February 6, a Chinese diplomat said in an interview with French news network LCI that the United States should return the recovered balloon debris to China.

On February 13, Chinese Foreign Affairs spokesperson Wang Wenbin said that U.S. high-altitude balloons had "illegally crossed China's airspace" more than ten times since 2022. According to CNN, he did not offer evidence. Wang also complained about U.S. reconnaissance against China and wiretapping efforts around the world. U.S. National Security spokesperson John Kirby said "there is no U.S. surveillance craft in China's airspace" but declined to specify whether his denial covered disputed airspace claimed by China. On February 14, Wang elaborated by saying that since 2022, circumnavigation balloons launched from U.S. soil flew over China and other countries illegally more than ten times.

On February 14, Minister of Foreign Affairs spokeswoman Hua Chunying suggested the U.S. was focused more on the "wandering civilian balloon" than the 2023 Ohio train derailment.

NATO 
NATO secretary-general Jens Stoltenberg said the balloon "confirms a pattern of Chinese behavior where we see that China has invested heavily in new capabilities, including different types of surveillance and intelligence platforms", and that it presents security challenges for the members of the alliance.

Australia 
Amidst the ongoing Australia–China trade war, Australian Minister for Foreign Affairs Penny Wong said: "I believe the US has managed this as carefully as possible. They brought the balloon down over their own territorial waters."

Japan
Japan said that it strongly suspected Chinese surveillance balloons had entered its territory on at least three occasions and told China that violations of its airspace by uncrewed surveillance balloons were absolutely unacceptable.

Singapore
The Singaporean Minister for Foreign Affairs, Vivian Balakrishnan, said that it was a "pity" that Blinken's visit to China was postponed. He added regarding the balloon that "hopefully both sides exercise sufficient self-restraint and reduce the prospects of such incidents".

United Kingdom 
Prime Minister Rishi Sunak stated on February 13 that the United Kingdom's government would do "whatever it takes" to defend the country from observation balloons. He added that the Royal Air Force had alerted Typhoon jets to stand-by. Furthermore, ex-MI6 chief Sir Alex Younger, said that due to the systematic nature of China's surveillance program, the UK must "wake up" to China's threat to global security.

Venezuela 
Venezuela's foreign ministry condemned the United States for shooting down what they stated was an unmanned civilian aircraft which posed no threat.

Moldova 
Both Moldova and Romania scrambled military jets after another balloon entered their airspace, and they compared it to the issue in the US.

Media reactions

Analysis 
Michael Clarke, a British defense analyst, said China wanted the balloon "to be noticed described" and described the incident as a "stunt gone wrong". Saying that the Chinese were "completely in the wrong", he surmised that the fly-over was China's way of retaliating for an agreement that was signed by the United States and the Philippines on February 2, which would grant four more US military bases in the Philippines in response to China's nine dash line claims.

Bonnie Glaser, a China expert at the German Marshall Fund of the United States, said that "we collect intelligence on China from bases all around their east coast, in Japan, Guam and Australia. We fly P-8 [spy plane] flights on a daily basis and the Chinese can't do that." Surveillance ballons might have been a creative way to collect information and to offer China some insights into US capabilities and possibly vulnerabilities.

John Blaxland, a professor of international security and intelligence studies at the Australian National University, suggested that the Chinese likely expected the balloon to be detected and being detected was the goal. He believes that the balloon was launched to embarrass the US, with intelligence gathering being a secondary objective. Baxland also said that the balloon could be designed to test the resolve of Washington as well as gather information about American detection capabilities and reaction.

On the shooting of the balloon, Christopher Twomey, a security scholar, said that any Chinese response would be restrained and that China would want to "sweep this under the rug" and emphasize senior-level visits within months.

Gregory Falco, an aerospace security expert at the Johns Hopkins University, said that the balloon was part of "China's hybrid communications architecture" of relaying surveillance data to satellites in Low Earth Orbit and back to Chinese ground stations. He also said that the large solar panels, antenna and the navigation capabilities onboard indicated it was engaged for surveillance and not weather data collection.

Satire 
The incident was satirized for the show Saturday Night Live the evening after it was shot down. In the sketch, performer Bowen Yang portrayed an anthropomorphized depiction of the downed balloon being interviewed by MSNBC journalist Katy Tur (played by Chloe Fineman). Some sources paid particular attention to Yang's line, "Congrats! You shot a balloon!", with USA Today using it in the headline of its coverage.

Other high-altitude objects 

Another balloon was detected flying over Latin America. The Costa Rican General Directorate of Civil Aviation confirmed the incursion by an object "not of Costa Rican origin", which the locals had first seen on February 2. Sightings of the balloon were also reported from Venezuela, specifically from Maracaibo. The U.S. Department of Defense confirmed those sightings and called the object another Chinese surveillance balloon. On February 6, Mao Ning, the spokeswoman for the Chinese government, confirmed the balloon belongs to China, but said that it was used for "flight tests" and was blown off-course in much the same manner as the one spotted over North America. VanHerck revealed on March 7 that China later took down the second balloon.

On February 10, another high-altitude object was shot down on the vicinity of Deadhorse, Alaska, over the Beaufort Sea; recovery efforts by the Alaska National Guard on the sea ice are on-going.

On February 11, on previous orders of Canadian Prime Minister Justin Trudeau, a "small, cylindrical object" was shot down over the Yukon Territory for violating Canadian air space; both U.S. and Canadian aircraft had scrambled, and a U.S. F-22 jet fighter made the kill.

On February 12, the US military shot down a fourth unidentified object over Lake Huron, within the maritime territory of Michigan.

On February 14, the US government announced that the latter three high-altitude objects shot down over the North America were likely private entities with no relations to China. Further analysis and debris collections were underway. The four AIM-9X missiles expended for shooting down the three objects cost at least $1.5 million.

On February 17, the US and Canada suspended their search for the debris from the downed objects and the missile that missed.

See also 

 1960 U-2 incident
 Balloon buster
 Fu-Go balloon bomb
 Hainan Island incident

Notes

References 

2023 controversies in the United States
China balloon incident
China balloon incident
China balloon incident
2023 in military history
China balloon incident
China balloon incident
China balloon incident
China balloon incident
21st-century aircraft shootdown incidents
21st-century history of the United States Air Force
Accidents and incidents involving balloons and airships
Aerial operations and battles involving the United States
Airstrikes conducted by the United States
Articles containing video clips
Canada–China relations
Biden administration controversies
China–United States relations
China balloon incident
China balloon incident
China balloon incident